Sperling–Burnaby Lake is an elevated station on the Millennium Line of Metro Vancouver's SkyTrain rapid transit system. The station is located on the southeast corner of the intersection at Sperling Avenue and Lougheed Highway in Burnaby, British Columbia, Canada. The Burnaby Lake Regional Park is located nearby, from which the name of the station is partially derived.

Station information

Station layout

Entrances

Sperling–Burnaby Lake station is served by two entrances. The main north entrance faces Lougheed Highway while the south entrance connects to the station's bus loop.

Transit connections

Sperling–Burnaby Lake station provides connections within Burnaby and to Simon Fraser University. The following bus routes serve the station:

References

External links

Millennium Line stations
Railway stations in Canada opened in 2002
Buildings and structures in Burnaby
2002 establishments in British Columbia